The High Commissioner of Malaysia to the Commonwealth of Australia is the head of Malaysia's diplomatic mission to Australia. The position has the rank and status of an Ambassador Extraordinary and Plenipotentiary and is based in the High Commission of Malaysia, Canberra.

List of heads of mission

High Commissioners to Australia

See also
Australia–Malaysia relations

References 

 
Australia
Malaysia